Alawwa Railway Station is a railway station in the town of Alawwa, which is located in the Kurunegala District of Sri Lanka. The station is owned by Sri Lanka Railways, the state-owned railway operator, the station is part of the Main line which links Badulla with the country's capital Colombo.

The station opened in 1866 when the Main line was extended from Ambepussa to Polgahawela.

The Alawwa rail bridge, which crosses the Maha Oya, consists of three  spans on masonry abutments and piers anchored into the bedrock.

In August 2001 thirteen people died in a train derailment near Alawwa.

In September 2011 five people were killed and over thirty injured when a passenger train collided with a stationary train at the station.

Continuity

References 

Railway stations on the Main Line (Sri Lanka)
Railway stations in Kurunegala District